Narbağı (also, Narbagı and Narbagy) is a village and municipality in the Lankaran Rayon of Azerbaijan.  It has a population of 487.

References 

Populated places in Lankaran District